Margaret Bartley (née Ciszek; born December 21, 1959) is an American lawyer and judge from Maryland. She is the chief judge of the United States Court of Appeals for Veterans Claims.

Education & career
Bartley received a Bachelor of Arts, cum laude, from Pennsylvania State University in 1981 and a Juris Doctor, cum laude, from the American University Washington College of Law in 1993.

From 1982 to 1983 she was an assistant to an account executive and later a receptionist at CIMA (Corporate Insurance Management) in Woodbridge, Virginia. In 1981 and 1983 she was morning manager and later a counter clerk at Debonair Cleaners in Washington, DC. In 1984 she was a kitchen manager and later a cook for Homespun, Inc. From 1985 to early 1986 she was an administrative assistant to Stanley Kaplan, an Optometrist. From 1987 to 1988 she was a data entry clerk for the Committee in Solidarity with the People of El Salvador. From 1988 to 1989 she was an administrative assistant and later secretary to Kelly Temporary Services.

She was thereafter a law clerk to Judge Jonathan R. Steinberg of the Court of Appeals for Veterans Claims. She then worked as a staff attorney, and then senior staff attorney, for the National Veterans Legal Services Program, serving as editor in chief of that organization's quarterly report, and served as Director of Outreach and Education for the Veterans Consortium Pro Bono Program from 2005 to 2012. Since 2000, she has served as an assistant editor and later editor of the Veterans Advocate. From 1991 to 1993 she was a Dean's Fellow to Professor Nancy Polikoff at the Washington College of Law.

In 2012, Bartley was nominated by President Barack Obama to a seat on the Court of Appeals for Veterans Claims. She was confirmed by the United States Senate on May 24, 2012, on the same day as Coral Wong Pietsch. She became Chief Judge on December 4, 2019.

References

External links
United States Court of Appeals for Veterans Claims biography of Margaret Bartley
NOMINATIONS OF THE 112TH CONGRESS, SECOND SESSION - HEARINGS BEFORE THE COMMITTEE ON VETERANS’ AFFAIRS - UNITED STATES SENATE (S. HRG. 112–510) 

1959 births
Living people
Judges of the United States Court of Appeals for Veterans Claims
Pennsylvania State University alumni
People from Pittsburgh
United States Article I federal judges appointed by Barack Obama
21st-century American judges
Washington College of Law alumni